Walter Scott (born 2 October 1999), is an Australian professional footballer who plays as a left back for Wollongong Wolves.

International career
In October 2018, Scott was called up to the Australia U20 squad to compete in the 2018 AFC U-19 Championship held in Indonesia.

Honours
Perth Glory
 A-League: Premiers 2018–19

References

External links

1999 births
Living people
Australian soccer players
Association football defenders
Perth Glory FC players
Wellington Phoenix FC players
Macarthur FC players
APIA Leichhardt FC players
A-League Men players
National Premier Leagues players
People from Bowral
Sportsmen from New South Wales
Soccer players from New South Wales